Răcăciuni is a commune in Bacău County, Western Moldavia, Romania. It is composed of six villages: Ciucani, Fundu Răcăciuni, Gheorghe Doja, Gâșteni, Răcăciuni and Răstoaca.

The commune is located in the south-central part of the county, on the right back of the Siret River, next to the Răcăciuni dam and reservoir. The river Răcăciuni flows through the commune, reaching there the Siret.

Răcăciuni is crossed by the DN2 road, which connects the county seat, Bacău, to Focșani and forms part of the European route E85. On the eastern side of the commune is the Răcăciuni railway station, serving the Căile Ferate Române Line 500 that runs from Bucharest to Focșani, Bacău, and on north to the Ukrainian border. The A7 and A13 motorways, the latter which would serve as a connection between Western Moldavia and Southern Transylvania, are planned to meet on the south-eastern side of the commune.

At the 2011 census, 91.12% of inhabitants were ethnic Romanians, 4.36% Hungarians and 1.78% Roma. At the 2002 census, 51.3% were Roman Catholic, 47.7% Romanian Orthodox, 0.6% Seventh-day Adventist and 0.4% Pentecostal.

During the interwar period, the commune was the seat of Plasa Răcăciuni.

References

Communes in Bacău County
Localities in Western Moldavia